Mount Tremper is a hamlet in the Town of Shandaken in Ulster County, New York, United States. Mount Tremper is situated to the east of New York State Route 28 and to the north of New York State Route 212, within the Catskill Park. It is named for nearby Mount Tremper.

Attractions
Among the cultural attractions in the area is Mount Tremper Arts, a non-profit organization. MTA features performances, art exhibitions, artist residencies, educational programming, and informal gatherings. The Mount Tremper Fire Observation Station, built circa 1917, was used for fire observation until 1971. The 47-foot tower was opened to tourists on June 9, 2001. Mount Tremper is the site of Zen Mountain Monastery, the main house of the Mountains and Rivers Order of Zen Buddhism. The Mount Tremper trailhead is a lovely hike any time of year. Many come to fish for Rainbow Trout at the Esopus Creek.

Lodging and dining
Mount Tremper is home to The Pines, a locally owned honky tonk and restaurant. Kate's Lazy Meadow is a motel owned by Kate Pierson, one of the founding members of The B-52s. Although it is called Woodstock Brewery, this craft brewery is closer to Mt. Tremper than Woodstock. Overlook Creek Cottages is a compound that overlooks the Esopus and views of Mt. Tremper.

Notable residents 
Brasheedah Elohim, American-Israeli women's professional basketball player
Michael Lang, American concert promoter, producer, and manager
Emel Mathlouthi, Tunisian singer-songwriter, composer, and humanist
Kathy Ruttenberg, American sculptor and visual artist

References 

Hamlets in Ulster County, New York
Catskills